Silver Oaks International Schools is a group of Indian educational institutions established in April 2002. The chain of schools opened its first campus at Bachupally, Hyderabad, and currently operates five campuses in Hyderabad, Bangalore and Visakhapatnam. Its tagline is 'character first, competence next,' and its processes and values claim to be largely drawn from the freedom fighter era in India's history.

The courses and curricula offered differ from campus to campus; the CBSE and IB curricula are offered across all campuses. The school has many competitor schools in Hyderabad including Oakridge International School, Chirec International School etc.

Curriculum

PP1 to Grade 6 - PYP 

The IB Primary Years Program (PYP) is a theme / research-based learning methodology for children aged 3 – 12.

Grade 7 to Grade 12 - CBSE 

CBSE provides instruction in health and physical education, life skills, values education, art education, work education and other co-scholastic areas.

The school is also an exam centre for CBSE Grade 10 & 12 board examinations and also NEET.

Facilities

Sports Facilities

Labs

Uniform / dress Code 
The school has a uniform dress code for all students which involves a black pinstriped bottom matched with a white shirt with silver oaks logo. The students also wear a red windcheater when its windy or cold. Senior School students also have an additional grey waistcoat as a part of their uniform. The school recommends black running shoes and parents are free to purchase the brand of their choice. From 2019 the school introduced sports dress which involves a grey quickdry T-shirt with a black track pant.

Other Campuses in the group

Programmes offered at other campuses

Controversies
 
 
In 2017, Silver Oaks was accused of ignoring that its minor students attending a three-day event conducted in Bangalore, which had been organized by a student, were served alcohol, the money for event was from a website page, Indian Diplomatic Summit, and invited members from school and members from various social media group. The cost of the event was approximately 1.80 lakhs.

References

High schools and secondary schools in Hyderabad, India
International Baccalaureate schools in India
High schools and secondary schools in Andhra Pradesh
High schools and secondary schools in Bangalore
2002 establishments in Andhra Pradesh
Educational institutions established in 2002